Gerd Peehs (born 21 January 1942) is a retired German football player. He spent seven seasons in the Bundesliga with Borussia Neunkirchen and Borussia Dortmund.

References

External links
 

1942 births
Living people
German footballers
Borussia Dortmund players
Bundesliga players
Borussia Neunkirchen players
SV Saar 05 Saarbrücken players
Association football defenders